Expo mascots have been used at Bureau International des Expositions approved World's fairs since the 1984 Louisiana World Exposition. Seymore D. Fair, was the official mascot of the 1984 Louisiana World Exposition as well as the first mascot at any world's fair, and was followed by many more whimsical character mascots.

The mascots

 
 Seymore D. Fair, the official mascot for the 1984 Louisiana World Exposition, was a 7'6" tall white pelican, as well as the first mascot at any world's fair. Seymore was seen as a way to highlight the fresh water theme and appeal to children.
 Cosmo Hoshimaru, mascot for the 1985 Tsukuba Specialized Exposition
 Expo Ernie, a robot mascot for the 1986 Vancouver Specialized Expo
 Expo Oz, mascot for the 1988 Brisbane World Expo
 Curro, mascot for the 1992 Seville World Expo
 Kumdori, mascot for the 1993 Taejon Specialized Expo
 Gil, designed by painter António Modesto and sculptor Artur Moreiraand named Gil, after Portuguese navigator Gil Eanes was the for the 1998 Lisbon Specialized Expo
 Twipsy, mascot for the 2000 Hannover World Expo
 Kiccoro & Morizo, mascots for the 2005 Aichi World Expo
 Fluvi, mascot for the 2008 Zaragoza Specialized Expo
 Haibao, mascot for the 2010 Shanghai World Expo
 Yeony & Suny, mascot for the 2012 Yeosu Specialized Expo
 Foody, a salad-like mascot for the 2015 Milan World Expo
 Saule, Kuat & Moldir for the  2017 Astana Specialized Expo
 Rashid, Latifa,  Alif, Opti and Terra mascots for the 2020 Dubai World Expo

References

World's Fair
Mascots
Mascots